The Central Union of Hotel, Restaurant and Cafe Employees (ZVHRC) was a trade union representing hospitality workers in Germany.

The union was founded in 1920, when the Union of German Restaurant Workers merged with the Union of Hotel, Restaurant and Cafe Employees and the Union of Chefs.  The union affiliated to the General German Trade Union Confederation, and internationally, to the International Union of Hotel, Restaurant and Bar Workers.  By the end of 1931, the union had 29,618 members.

In 1933, the union was banned by the Nazis, but it continued to organise underground, especially in Frankfurt.  It printed a newspaper and sent it to a limited number of members, but in 1936, the Gestapo acquired a list of recipients and closed the organisation down.

Presidents
1920: Rudolf Ströhlinger
1930: Fritz Saar

References

Hospitality industry trade unions
Trade unions in Germany
Trade unions established in 1920
Trade unions disestablished in 1933